Going Home or Goin' Home may refer to:

Film and television

Films
 Going Home (1944 film), an unreleased entry in the Private Snafu series
 Going Home (1971 film), starring Robert Mitchum
 Going Home (1987 film), starring Nicholas Campbell
 Going Home (Oeroeg), a Dutch film of 1993
 Tom Petty: Going Home, a 1994 TV documentary starring Tom Petty
 Going Home, a 1996 short film featuring Gloria LeRoy 
 Going Home, a 2000 film starring Jason Robards and Clint Black
 Going Home, a part of the 2002 Asian horror movie collaboration Three
 Going Home, a 2014 Indian short film directed by Vikas Bahl, starring Alia Bhatt
 Going Home, a 2015 Nigerian film directed by Chika Anadu

Television
 Going Home (TV series), a 2000–2001 Australian drama series
 "Going Home" (Once Upon a Time), a television episode

Literature
Going Home (Steel novel), a 1973 novel by Danielle Steel
Going Home (Peyton novel), a 1982 children's novel by K. M. Peyton
Going Home (comics), a 1998–2001 Cerebus the Aardvark graphic novel and its first collected volume by Dave Sim
Going Home (play), a 1976 play by Alma De Groen

Music

Artists 
 Going Home (band), an American pop-punk band
 Going Home, an American folk music duo with Hope Sandoval

Albums
 Going Home (Elvin Jones album), 1992
 Going Home (Taj Mahal album), 1980
 Going Home, a 1975 album by Ten Years After
 Going Home, a 1971 album by Georgie Fame
 Goin' Home (Archie Shepp and Horace Parlan album), 1977
 Goin' Home (Art Pepper and George Cables album), 1982
 Goin' Home (Bob Stewart album), 1988
 Goin' Home: A Tribute to Fats Domino, 2007
 Goin' Home, a 2004 album by Paul Rishell and Annie Raines
 Goin' Home, a 2014 album by Kenny Wayne Shepherd

Songs
 "Going Home" (Kenny G composition), 1990
 "Going Home", a 1997 song by ex-Santana members from the album Abraxas Pool
 "Going Home", a 1976 song by Alice Cooper from Alice Cooper Goes to Hell
 "Going Home", a 2008 song by Brian Wilson from That Lucky Old Sun
 "Going Home", a 1995 song by Disciple from What Was I Thinking
 "Going Home", a 1990 song by Leo Sayer from Cool Touch
 "Going Home", a 2012 song by Leonard Cohen from Old Ideas
 "Going Home", a 2003 song by Mary Fahl from The Other Side of Time, used as an opening theme of the film Gods and Generals
 "Going Home", a 1992 song by Miles Davis and Michel Legrand from the film soundtrack Dingo
 "Going Home", a 1979 song by Runrig from The Highland Connection 
 "Going Home", a 2001 song by Sara Groves from Conversations
 "Going Home", a 2014 song by Sophie Zelmani from Going Home
 "Going Home", a 2018 song by Snoop Dogg from Bible of Love
 "Going Home: Theme of the Local Hero", a 1983 instrumental track by Mark Knopfler from the soundtrack to the film Local Hero
 "Goin' Home" (composition), a 1922 spiritual-like song adapted by William Arms Fisher from Symphony No. 9 (From the New World) by Antonín Dvořák
 "Goin' Home" (Rolling Stones song), 1966
 "Goin' Home" (The Osmonds song), 1973
 "Goin' Home", a 1986 song by Corey Hart from Fields of Fire
 "Goin' Home", a 2009 song by Dan Auerbach from Keep It Hid, featured in the 2009 film Up in the Air
 "Goin' Home", a 1993 song by Dinosaur Jr. from Where You Been
 "Goin' Home", a 1955 song by Fats Domino featured on Rock and Rollin' with Fats Domino
 "Goin' Home", a 1991 song by Helloween from Pink Bubbles Go Ape
 "Goin' Home", a 1977 song by Missouri from Missouri
 "Goin' Home", a 2002 song by Neil Young from Are You Passionate?
 "Goin' Home", a 1998 song by Toto from Toto XX
 “Goin' Home", a 2022 song by Alan Parsons from “From the New World”

See also
 I'm Going Home (disambiguation)
 Coming Home (disambiguation)
 Homegoing, an African-American funeral tradition